Krivo Brdo is a small settlement in the hills between the valleys of the Poljane Sora and Selca Sora rivers in the Upper Carniola region of Slovenia.  It lies in the Municipality of Gorenja Vas–Poljane.

References

External links

Krivo Brdo on Geopedia

Populated places in the Municipality of Gorenja vas-Poljane